is a Japanese former football player who last played for Kataller Toyama.

Club career
After a decade with Kataller Toyama, Kokeguchi retired at the end of the 2019 season.

National team career
In June 2005, Kokeguchi was selected Japan U-20 national team for 2005 World Youth Championship. At this tournament, he played 2 matches.

Club statistics
Updated to 1 January 2020.

References

External links

1985 births
Living people
Association football people from Okayama Prefecture
Japanese footballers
Japan youth international footballers
J1 League players
J2 League players
J3 League players
Cerezo Osaka players
JEF United Chiba players
Kataller Toyama players
Association football forwards